The second city of the United Kingdom is an unofficial claim made at various times by several cities since the establishment of the Kingdom of Great Britain in 1707 (the United Kingdom was formed in January 1801). Commonly a country's "second city" is the city that is thought to be the second-most important, according to criteria such as population size, economic importance and cultural contribution. The UK adheres to the primate city rule, meaning that its largest city is disproportionately larger than all the others. London, the UK's capital, is by far its largest city, with the UK's other major cities generally more like each other in population and economy than any one of them is to London. As the title is unofficial and there is no agreed set of criteria, the 'second city' debate is ultimately a subjective one.

No one city has consistently held claim to the 'second city' title over the course of British history. In the middle ages, Norwich was the second-largest city in England, being gradually superseded by Bristol from the seventeenth century onwards. During the latter half of the Georgian era ( 1750–1830), Dublin was widely considered to be the second city of the British Empire, although by the turn of the 20th century the city had been eclipsed by several rapidly industrialising cities in Britain. This included Glasgow, which by Victorian times was sometimes described as the second city of the Empire. 

Today, Birmingham is typically described as the UK's second city. In recent decades, Manchester has come to be regarded as a contender for the title.

There are alternative claims for Edinburgh, by virtue of being the capital of Scotland, and for Cardiff and Belfast due to their status as the respective capital cities of Wales and Northern Ireland.

History
The title Second City of the Empire or Second City of the British Empire was claimed by a number of cities in the 18th, 19th and early 20th centuries. Commercial trading city Liverpool was regarded as holding this title with its massive port, merchant fleet and world-wide trading links. Liverpool was constantly referred to as the New York of Europe. Others included Dublin, Glasgow (which continues to use the title as a marketing slogan), and (outside the UK) Kolkata and Philadelphia.

Prior to the union with Scotland in 1707, from the English Civil War until the 18th century, Norwich was the second-largest city of the Kingdom of England, being a major trading centre, Britain's richest provincial city and county town of Norfolk, at that time the most populous county of England. Bristol was the second-wealthiest city in England in the 16th century; and by the 18th century, Bristol was often described as the second city of England. During the 19th century, claims were made for Manchester, Liverpool and York. York had also been named as the second city in earlier centuries, by virtue of its prominence in Roman times as the northern capital, Eboracum, of the Roman province of Britannia Inferior.

By the early 19th century, Glasgow was frequently referred to as the second city; and during much of the 20th century it had a population of over one million, larger than that of Birmingham until the 1951 census. For example, the Official Census population for Glasgow was 0.784 million in April 1911; 1.034 million in April 1921; 1.088 million in April 1931 and 1.090 million in April 1951. However, slum clearance in the 1960s led to displacement of residents from the city centre to new communities located outside the city boundaries. This, together with local government reorganisation, resulted in the official population of Glasgow falling sharply. The Glasgow City Council area currently has a population of 600,000 although the surrounding conurbation of Greater Glasgow has a population of 1,199,629. In contrast, the population of the city of Birmingham has remained steady around the one million mark; its central population fell like Glasgow's, but the city boundaries were extended several times in the early 20th century. Occasional claims were made for Liverpool, Birmingham and Manchester.

Modern points of view
Birmingham has generally been considered to be the second city of the United Kingdom since the time of World War I. However, in recent years Manchester has been pitched as a contender for the title.

Population
Birmingham is the more populous city and is recognised as such by His Majesty's Government. However, confusion surrounding the correct way to define the two cities' populations, along with the publication of outdated, inaccurate or estimated population statistics, has sometimes led to erroneous comparisons between them.

According to the 2021 United Kingdom census, the City of Birmingham is the most populous local government district in the United Kingdom with a population of 1.145 million — substantially larger than the City of Manchester, which at 552,000 is only the fifth largest, behind Birmingham, Leeds, Glasgow and Sheffield. 

However, municipal boundaries are problematic for comparing modern cities: many suburbs of Bristol, Birmingham and Manchester fall outside city limits largely drawn up in Victorian times, and the surrounding conurbations and areas that can be considered part of each city are hard to define. Manchester is regarded as a particularly 'under-bounded' city, whose archaic boundaries no longer accurately reflect its true size. To reflect this, the City of Manchester is sometimes conflated with Greater Manchester, the metropolitan county and combined authority which includes the neighbouring City of Salford and eight other metropolitan boroughs that broadly define the conurbation. According to the 2021 census, Greater Manchester had a total population of 2.868 million. This is nonetheless marginally smaller than the equivalent metropolitan county and combined authority of the West Midlands, which comprises the cities of Birmingham, Coventry, Wolverhampton, and four other metropolitan boroughs, with a total combined population of 2.92 million.

There are several drawbacks to this approach. The first is the arbitrary nature of the metropolitan county boundaries, which were drawn up in the early-1970s as administrative divisions and do not necessarily reflect the present state of either conurbation. A second drawback is the implication that each county is, in itself, homogeneous, thus ignoring the sensitivities of the distinct settlements which fall within the boundaries of the county but may not identify strongly with its principal city, for example the Black Country in the West Midlands, or Bolton in Greater Manchester. Relatedly, a third drawback is in the names of the counties themselves: Manchester has been able to leverage the name of its metropolitan county to build a cohesive "place brand", whereas Birmingham's comparative sphere of influence tends to be hidden within the West Midlands moniker.

In an attempt to circumvent the first of these drawbacks, the population of each city is sometimes taken to be the contiguous built-up urban area of their respective conurbations. According to a methodology defined by the Office for National Statistics in 2011, the Greater Manchester Built-up Area's population of 2.55 million is marginally bigger than that of the West Midlands conurbation, at 2.44 million. This disparity is explained by the area of green belt known as the Meriden Gap, which separates the City of Coventry from the rest of the West Midlands built-up area. However, these statistics must also be treated with caution, firstly because they are based on ONS data from the 2011 census, which is now outdated, and secondly because the ONS tends to alter its methodology from one census to the next, meaning the urban fabric of each conurbation has the potential to be redefined when data from the 2021 census is published sometime in 2023. Furthermore, this methodology does not address the aforementioned issues associated with homogeneity or place branding.

An alternative methodology, based around the concept of primary urban areas, is used by Centre for Cities to publish urban policy research. Primary urban areas are intended to allow economic and social comparisons between cities, using definitions less arbitrary than the administrative boundaries of local authorities, but avoiding some of the issues associated with agglomerating distinct urban settlements into single cities. According to the Centre for Cities Data Tool, Birmingham's population in 2020 was 2.56 million, marginally ahead of Manchester's 2.52 million.

At other times, the wider metropolitan areas of the two cities are considered. Compared directly, the Birmingham Metropolitan Area is comfortably the larger of the two, with an estimated 2021 population of 4.34 million as opposed to Manchester's 3.1 million. This reflects the extensive hinterland surrounding the West Midlands conurbation, which encompasses commuter towns including Nuneaton, Warwick, Royal Leamington Spa, Redditch, Bromsgrove and Tamworth. These figures are projected from data taken for the  EU’s ESPON project in 2001 and are unlikely to be accurate, although they do provide a reasonable comparison of the respective metro regions and add weight to the generally accepted claim that Birmingham is the UK's second-largest city.

In the media
The media typically describe Birmingham as the second city.

Reporting on the Birmingham 2022 Commonwealth Games in July and August 2022, ten of the twelve nationally distributed daily newspapers in the United Kingdom published articles referring to Birmingham as the "second city" of either the United Kingdom, Britain or England: The Times, The Daily Telegraph, The i, The Guardian, The Independent, and The Daily Mirror. The same phrasing appeared in the freesheet press, including The Metro and City A.M., regional publications including The London Evening Standard, The Scottish Herald, The Northern Echo and The Yorkshire Post, special interest publications including The Voice, and a number of international publications including The New Zealand Herald, The Times Colonist and The National. Publications including The Financial Times and The Scotsman have also referred to Birmingham's second city status.

During the same period, the BBC published a "Brummies' guide to Birmingham and beyond" which contained the subheading "Something for everyone in the second city", while Sky published a legacy piece discussing the concerns of "people who live in Britain's second city". Other national broadcasters whose websites have, at different times, referred to Birmingham as the second city include ITV, and Channel 4.

Since 2010, major international news providers including Reuters, The Associated Press, Agence France-Presse, Bloomberg News, CNN International, Al Jazeera and The New York Times Company have all referred to Birmingham as the second city of either Britain or England, although the descriptor "second-largest city" is also frequently seen. In 2019, an article in the New York Times suggested both Liverpool and Manchester might lay claim to being England's cultural second city.

Travel and events publications including Lonely Planet, Rough Guides and Time Out refer to Birmingham as the second city.

Public opinion polls
As the second city is an unofficial title and one of subjective opinion, a number of polls have been conducted over the years. Despite Birmingham being viewed as the traditional second city, public polls have shown a slight preference for Manchester since 2000:
A 2002 survey conducted by Ipsos MORI, commissioned by "Visit Manchester" (Manchester's tourism department), Manchester received the highest response for the category of second city at 34%, compared to Birmingham at 29%; and in the same poll, Manchester had the highest response for the category of third city with 27% of the vote, 6% more than the 21% for Birmingham. 85% of respondents put London as first City.
A 2015 survey by YouGov showed that 30% thought Manchester was the second city, 20% thought Birmingham and 12% thought Edinburgh.
A 2017 survey by BMG Research, commissioned by the Birmingham Mail, showed 38% preferred Manchester as the second city versus 36% for Birmingham. 16% choose Edinburgh with 10% for other cities. The opinion poll also found a stark generational divide with 44% of 18 to 24 year olds choosing Manchester as their preferred second city compared with only 19% who stated Birmingham and 25% of this age group also selecting Edinburgh over Birmingham. However, of those 65 and older, 40% preferred Birmingham and 38% preferred Manchester.

Ministerial statements
Although the government does not publish policy on the matter, ministers have tended to endorse Birmingham's status as the country's second city.

 In July 2022, Jacob Rees-Mogg, Minister of State for Brexit Opportunities and Government Efficiency, responded to a question about the city by stating: "Birmingham is the second city of the United Kingdom and London has got all the attention in recent decades but Birmingham has kept up, has been the next contender. And I think that's really important for balancing the United Kingdom, that Birmingham continues to be a strong, important and vibrant city as it is."
 In November 2016, Sajid Javid, then Secretary of State for Levelling Up, Housing and Communities, delivered a speech to Birmingham's Asian Business Chamber of Commerce entitled: "A second city that's second to none", a claim he reiterated during his speech.
 In February 2015, then Prime Minister David Cameron stated "Birmingham is Britain’s second city, it is a powerhouse." On 16 February 2016 he emphasised that "We recognise Birmingham’s status as Britain’s second city". He repeated this claim on 16 March 2016 when he stated "Birmingham is the second city of our country" during Prime Minister's Questions.
 In February 2007, Digby Jones, Baron Jones of Birmingham, former Minister of State at the Department for Business, Enterprise and Regulatory Reform and the Foreign Office (former Director-General of the Confederation of British Industry (CBI) said "Birmingham is naturally the second-most important city in Britain after London because of where she is and how important she is as part of that crossroads".
 In March 2005, David Miliband, the former Secretary of State for Foreign and Commonwealth Affairs, and former Shadow Foreign Secretary said: "However, if you look at Birmingham, I think a lot of people would say that it's a city, Britain's second city..."

A notable exception was John Prescott, former Deputy Prime Minister and Member of Parliament for the constituency of Kingston upon Hull East, who concluded a conference speech in Manchester in 2007 with the words "...Manchester – our second city", although this was later played down by his department, claiming they were made in a "light-hearted context". Prescott had previously declared Birmingham the second city while on a visit to the newly built Bullring Shopping Centre in 2003.

At different times, MPs representing constituencies in Manchester and Glasgow have spoken out in support of their respective cities' claims:

 Graham Stringer, MP for Blackley and Broughton, stated "Manchester has always been the second city after the capital, in many ways it is the first. Birmingham has never really been in the competition." 
 Sandra White, former Scottish National Party MSP for Glasgow, claimed "Glasgow was always seen as the second city in the Empire, and Glasgow is still the second British city."

However, in 2007, Phil Woolas MP for the constituency of Oldham East and Saddleworth, former Minister of State for the Environment, appeared to concede the second city title to Birmingham, remarking: "And, of course, I, and colleagues in Manchester, am pleased to see its very sensible plans to relocate to Manchester – Britain's third city."

Most recently, MP for Solihull, Julian Knight conceded that people see Manchester as England's second city but argued that "Birmingham is bigger, more diverse and frankly a more interesting place to be." He suggested that the Birmingham 2022 Commonwealth Games would cement Birmingham's place as England's second city.

See also
List of city nicknames in the United Kingdom
List of towns and cities in England by historical population

References

Cities in the United Kingdom
Culture in Belfast
Culture in Birmingham, West Midlands
Culture in Bristol
Culture in Cardiff
Culture in Edinburgh
Culture in Glasgow
Culture in Leeds
Culture in Liverpool
Culture in Manchester